

Belgium
 Congo Free State 
 Théophile Wahis, Governor-General of the Congo Free State (1892–1908)
 Émile Wangermée, acting Governor-General of the Congo Free State (1896–1900)

France
 French Somaliland – Léonce Lagarde, Governor of French Somaliland (1888–1899)
 Guinea – Noël-Eugène Ballay, Lieutenant-Governor of Guinea (1896–1898)

Japan
 Taiwan – Nogi Maresuke, Governor-General of Taiwan (14 October 1896 – January 1898)

Portugal
 Angola –
 Gilherme Auguste de Brito Capelo, Governor-General of Angola (1896–1897)
 António Duarte Ramada Curto, Governor-General of Angola (1897–1900)

United Kingdom
 Malta Colony – Arthur Fremantle, Governor of Malta (1893–1899)
 Colony of Natal – Sir Walter Hely-Hutchinson (1893–1901)
 Royal Niger Company – Sir George Taubman Goldie, Governor of the Royal Niger Company (1895–1900)
 New South Wales – Viscount Hampden, Governor of New South Wales (1895–1899)
 North-Eastern Rhodesia
 Patrick William Forbes, Administrator of North-Eastern Rhodesia (1895–1897)
 Henry Lawrence Daly, acting Administrator of North-Eastern Rhodesia (1897–1898)
*#Territory was not a UK protectorate at the time.
 North-Western Rhodesia
 British South Africa Company establishes colony of North-Western Rhodesia, 9 April
 Robert Thorne Coryndon, Administrator of North-Western Rhodesia (1897–1899)
*#Territory was not a UK protectorate at the time.
 Queensland – Charles Cochrane-Baillie, Governor of Queensland (1896 – 31 December 1900 then State Governor on Australia's Federation to 1901)
 Tasmania – Jenico Preston, Lord Gormanston, Governor of Tasmania (1893–1900)
 South Australia – Sir Thomas Buxton, Governor of South Australia (1895–1899)
 Victoria – Thomas, Earl Brassey, Governor of Victoria (1895–1900)
 Western Australia – Lieutenant-Colonel Gerard Smith, Governor of Western Australia (1895–1900)

Colonial governors
Colonial governors
1897